Preeti Singh Shaktawat is an Indian politician and member of the Indian National Congress. She is a member of the Rajasthan Legislative Assembly from the Vallabhnagar constituency in Udaipur district.

References

Rajasthani people
Year of birth missing (living people)
Living people